Renato Benaglia (24 March 1938 – 1 February 2023) was an Italian football player and coach. He played for seven seasons (151 games, 7 goals) in the Serie A for ACF Fiorentina, Calcio Catania and A.S. Roma.

Honours
Fiorentina
 Coppa Italia: 1960–61

References

External links
 Career summary by playerhistory.com 

1938 births
2023 deaths
Italian footballers
Association football midfielders
Serie A players
Alma Juventus Fano 1906 players
ACF Fiorentina players
Catania S.S.D. players
A.S. Roma players
L.R. Vicenza players
Italian football managers
F.C. Grosseto S.S.D. managers
Sportspeople from the Province of Verona